The Byron Bay Writers Festival (also called Byron Writers Festival) is a literary event taking place annually in Byron Bay, New South Wales. The festival commenced in 1997 and was founded by Chris Hanley and a dedicated group of volunteers who in part drew some of their inspiration from the Adelaide Writers Week. It is held on the first weekend of August each year. As of 2010 it included presentations by over 100 participants. The festival has included interviews with a number of notable writers including Bret Easton Ellis, Matthew Reilly and Kathy Lette.

In 2005 the festival had an audience of between 7,000 and 8,000, an increase of 25 per cent over the previous year. Notable participants included Midnight Oil drummer and songwriter Rob Hirst, writers Delia Falconer and Kate Grenville, and novelist Robert Drewe who lives in the area.

The tenth festival was held in 2006, and attracted an audience of 9,000 across 90 sessions. Presenters included sports journalist Gideon Haigh, actor and writer William McInnes, and Robert Drewe.

The 2010 appearance by Bret Easton Ellis received mixed coverage following his remarks, both at the festival and through Twitter, about Australian singer Delta Goodrem, commenting "I didn't know who she was but God she's really hot".

The Byron Bay Writers Festival is organised through the Northern Rivers Writers' Centre.

References

External links
 Byron Bay Writers Festival website

Literary festivals in Australia
Festivals established in 1997
1997 establishments in Australia
Byron Bay, New South Wales
Festivals in New South Wales